Francis Twene (born 1 January 1995) is a Ghanaian professional footballer who plays as midfielder for Ghanaian Premier League side Bechem United F.C. He previously played for Berekum Chelsea.

Career

Berekum Chelsea 
Twene started his with the youth side of Berekum Chelsea. He was promoted into the senior team in 2016. He made his debut on 26 June 2016, in a 1–0 loss to Wa All Stars. He made 5 league appearances in his debut season. Over the next two seasons, being the 2017, 2018 seasons, he made one appearance each season. His breakout season came during the 2019 GFA Normalization Special Competition, which he played 11 out of 12 league matches and scored his debut goal in a 3–1 loss to his future club Bechem United on 15 May 2019. The following season, the 2019–20 season, he played in 4 league matches before the league was cancelled due to restrictions from the outbreak of the COVID-19 in Ghana.

Bechem United 
In September 2020, Twene joined Bechem United ahead of the 2020–21 season. On 18 December 2020, he made his debut after playing 79 minutes in a 2–1 victory over Karela United. After an impressive performance against Ashanti Gold on 27 December 2020, Twene was adjudged the man of the match with Steven Owusu scoring the lone goal to help Bechem win and move into first place after match day 6.

References

External links 

 
 

Living people
1995 births
Association football midfielders
Ghanaian footballers
Berekum Chelsea F.C. players
Bechem United F.C. players
Ghana Premier League players